Sunil Kumar Sharma is an Indian politician and member of the Bharatiya Janata Party. Sharma is a member of the Jammu and Kashmir Legislative Assembly from the Kishtwar constituency in Kishtwar District. Currently, he is Minister of State for Transport (Independent charge), Revenue, Public Works (Roads & Buildings), Rural Development & Panchayati Raj, Agriculture Production, YSS in Government of Jammu and Kashmir under Mehbooba Mufti.

He was recently upgraded to cabinet ministry PDD department in Jk government.

References 

People from Kishtwar district
Bharatiya Janata Party politicians from Jammu and Kashmir
Living people
Jammu and Kashmir MLAs 2014–2018
Year of birth missing (living people)